Teleiodes cyrtocostella is a moth of the family Gelechiidae. It is found in Korea.

The wingspan is 13.5–15.5 mm. The forewing markings are obscure, consisting of a central yellowish orange patch which is ill-defined in males, but well-developed in females. This patch has a few white scales on the anterior and posterior edge. Adults have been recorded on wing in May, suggesting a single generation per year.

References

Moths described in 1992
Teleiodes